Canticum Novum is the church choir of the Stellenbosch Dutch Reformed Church (Moederkerk). The choir exists as a society of the University of Stellenbosch and is the only choir in South Africa connected to a university singing only sacred music.

History
The activities of Canticum Novum are the continuance of a well-founded choir tradition that came about more than a century ago within the Stellenbosch Dutch Reformed Church. This tradition includes notable South African figures in choral music such as Gawie Cillié, Chris Swanepoel, Pieter van der Westhuizen and Anton Els. When the Stellenbosch Central Church separated from the Stellenbosch Church (Moederkerk) in 1959, Chris Swanepoel extended this tradition when he established a choir that consisted mainly of students. Out of this congregation the Stellenbosch Student Church later formed.

Pieter van der Westhuizen succeeded Swanepoel in 1965 as conductor and organist. He held this position for 25 years – until 1990. Anton Els became the new conductor and in the 5 years that he held the position, the choir underwent its first name change – from the Stellenbosch Central Church Choir to the Stellenbosch Student Church Choir.

As of 1996 Louis van der Watt is associated with the choir and the congregation as conductor and organist. In 2000 the name changed again, becoming Canticum Novum. Due to a remerging of the two churches in 2007, the Stellenbosch Student Church is presently part of Moederkerk, and as such Canticum Novum is once more its official choir, celebrating its 50th anniversary in 2009.

Throughout its existence the choir has achieved many successes and has acquired a distinctive and beloved character, also due to its student makeup. Canticum Novum is the only choir in South Africa that only sings sacred music while at the same time consisting mainly of students and young adults. Apart from being the Moederkerk Choir, Canticum Novum is also a stage choir that has a wide repertoire with works ranging from Bruckner, Rachmaninoff and Monteverdi to Negro Spirituals. Every year the choir also performs in one or more concerts with an orchestra including works by Händel, Mozart, Rossini, Bach and Schubert, to name but a few.

While having an impressive program, the value of the choir cannot be quantified. For those that sing in the choir, as well as those who listen in, the true value lies in the growth it brings to their lives. It is the recollections of clever comments during tours, camps and practice sessions and that mystical bond between them that share a sacred song that denotes the choir's worth. It is to be deeply touched by the words and music during a revered moment that brings amazing change in their life.

In 2018, Yolanda Botha took over as conductor.

Name and Motto
Cantate Domino canticum novum!
Sing to the Lord a new song!

The name Canticum Novum means "New Song" and is derived from Psalm 96:1, which starts with the words Cantate Domino canticum novum (Sing to the Lord a new song). Cantate Domino (Sing to the Lord) is then also the motto of the choir.

Canticum Novum strives to share the message of the Gospel, as well as honour God as the creator of music. The repertoire consists only of sacred songs, with at least some new songs every year. This goal is particularly evident in church services, where the focus of the music is to bring the Word and support the liturgy.

Emblem

The core consists of a Plane leaf, symbolic of steadfastness, with the primary vein typifying a cross. The nine points of the leaf represents, in this order, the supporters of the members as the uppermost leaflet, and the eight voice parts as the remaining leaflets. The leafstalk is turned clockwise, signifying advancement.

Cantate Domino canticum novum!

Repertoire
The choir is one of the few choirs in South Africa to sing only sacred music, but nevertheless holds regular public performances. It has become a tradition that, with the start of each year, the choir will practice and perform a mass or similar work with the University Stellenbosch Symphony Orchestra. The following works have been performed:
 2013 – Schubert Mass in A flat major D678
 2012 – Handel Messiah
 2011 – Vivaldi Magnificat, Handel Dettingen Anthem, Schubert Mass in G Major D167, Mozart Te Deum 
 2010 – Mozart Requiem
 2009 – Handel ''Messiah
 2008 – Vivaldi Magnificat & Credo and Handel Dixit Dominus
 2007 – Vivaldi Gloria and Handel Dettingen Te Deum
 2006 – Mozart Requiem
 2005 – Handel Messiah
 2004 – Handel Coronation Anthems
 2003 – Mozart Credo Mass in C Major, K.257, and Schubert Credo Mass in F Major, D105
 2002 – Mozart Requiem
 2001 – Bach Magnificat, Handel Dettingen Te Deum and Rossini's Stabat Mater
 2000 – Handel Messiah and Fauré Requiem
 1999 – Handel Dixit Dominus and Vivaldi Gloria
 1998 – Mozart Requiem

It has also become custom for the choir, or some members, to get invited to perform as additional members for several performances of other works during the year, which includes the Mozart Requiem (2007), Handel Messiah (2006) and Beethoven Symphony No. 9 (2005). In addition, in 2011 the choir performed the secular Carmina Burana.

The choir then follows an a cappella repertoire for the rest of the year. A wide range of music is considered and the repertoire includes works from composers Monteverdi, Bruckner, Rachmaninoff, Randall Thompson etc. as well as Negro Spirituals. Other favourites include Afrikaans works by composers such as Chris Lambrecht and Pieter van der Westhuizen (ex-conductor of Canticum Novum), to name but a few.

External links
 Canticum Novum Homepage
 Stellenbosch Dutch Reformed Church (Moederkerk)

South African choirs
Stellenbosch University
Musical groups established in 1959
1959 establishments in South Africa